Frisbee is an unincorporated community and Census-designated place in Dunklin County, in the U.S. state of Missouri.

History
A variant name was "Manley". A post office called Frisbee was established in 1907, the name was changed to Manley in 1908, and the post office closed in 1918. The present name is apparently after one Mr. Frisbee, a railroad worker.

Demographics

References

Unincorporated communities in Dunklin County, Missouri
Unincorporated communities in Missouri